These are the official results of the Men's hammer throw event at the 1998 European Championships in Budapest, Hungary. Thirty-six athletes took part. The qualification mark was set at 77.00 metres.

Medalists

Schedule
All times are Central European Time (UTC+1)

Abbreviations
All results shown are in metres

Records

Qualification

Group A

Group B

Final

See also
 1995 Men's World Championships Hammer Throw (Gothenburg)
 1996 Men's Olympic Hammer Throw (Atlanta)
 1997 Men's World Championships Hammer Throw (Athens)
 1998 Hammer Throw Year Ranking
 1999 Men's World Championships Hammer Throw (Seville)
 2000 Men's Olympic Hammer Throw (Sydney)

References
 Results
 hammerthrow.wz

Hammer throw
Hammer throw at the European Athletics Championships